Mueda, Memória e Massacre (Mueda, Memory and Massacre) is a 1979 Mozambican film directed by Ruy Guerra and considered the country's first feature fiction film. The film captures the annual theatrical re-enactment of the Mueda Massacre of 1960 that left over 600 peaceful protesters dead.

Synopsis 
The film depicts a re-enactment of the 1960 Mueda Massacre played by amateur Makonde actors from Mueda that have been re-enacted publicly since independence in 1975. The massacre was a key catalyst for the start of the Mozambican War of Independence and for the formation of FRELIMO.

Plot 
A delegation of Mozambican exiles from Tanganyika cross the border and ask the Portuguese administrator for independence. After three delegations arrive and each demand independence the administrator agrees to address their grievances at the public square in the presence of the Provincial Governor. A large crowd gathers and the Governor rejects the request for independence while arresting two of the exiles, Faustino Vamomba and Mateus Waduvani, and sending them away in jeeps. The crowd protests and attempt to stop the jeep from leaving before the soldiers open fire on the crowd.

Cast 
 Filipe Gumoguacala as Cometeiro Cassimuca
 Romao Comapoquele as Faustino Vamomba
 Baltazar Nchulema as Tac Tac Mandusse
 Mauricio Machimbuco as Imterprete
 Alfredo Mtapumsunji as Administrador
 Cassiamo Camilio as Aspirante
 Antonio Jumba as Cabo dos Cipauos

Credits 
 Director: Ruy Guerra
 Executive Producers: Jacques Schwarztein, Camilo de Sousa
 Cinematography: Ruy Guerra, Fernando Silva
 Camera Assistants: Fernando Silva, Isac Sodas
 Editing: Ruy Guerra
 Editing Assistants: Mario Felix, Moina Forjay, Fernando Silva, Jax, Jose Cabral, Emoque Mate
 Sound Direction: Valente Dimande, Gabriel Mondlande
 Mixing: Ron Hallis
 Drama Director: Calisto dos Lagos
 Documention: Licinio de Azevedo, Roxo Leao
 Translations: Joao Jonas, Victor Simba
 Scene Photography: Jose Cabral
 Disclosures: Pedro Pimenta
 Placards: Carlos Silva
 Photo Retouching: Edgar Mousa, Antonio Tembe
 Negative Cut: J. Bai Bai
 Poster: D.N.P.P
 Testimonials: Faustimo Vanomba, Mutchamu Tumula, Saide Namuolo, Cristimo Maumda, Baltazar Nchulema, Ernesto TchipaKalia

Awards 
The film won awards at various international film festivals including:
 Tashkent Film Festival, 1980
 Berlin International Film Festival, 1981
 Locarno International Film Festival, 1980

References

External links

1979 films
Mozambican documentary films
1979 documentary films
Documentary films about war
Mozambican Civil War
Films set in 1960
Colonialism in popular culture